Chestnutflat is an unincorporated area in Walker County, in the U.S. state of Georgia.

History
A variant name is "Chestnut Flat". A post office called Chestnut Flat was established in 1841, and remained in operation until 1904. The community was named for a grove of chestnut trees near the original town site.

References

Unincorporated communities in Walker County, Georgia
Unincorporated communities in Georgia (U.S. state)